The mixed nine-pin doubles event  in bowling at the 2005 World Games took place from 15 to 16 July 2005 at the Sporthalle Krefelder Straße in Duisburg, Germany.

Competition format
A total of 8 pairs entered the competition. Best four duets from preliminary round qualifies to the final.

Results

Preliminary

Final

References

External links
 Results on IWGA website

Bowling at the 2005 World Games